Cornwall College is a public high school for boys established in 1896 and located on Orange Street in Montego Bay, Saint James, Jamaica. It is the third oldest high school in the county of Cornwall. As of the 2018–19 school year, the school had an enrollment of 1,317 students and 73 classroom teachers, for a student–teacher ratio of 19:1.

History

1841–1895
The school in St. James dates to the 19th century, when secondary education was greatly needed in the parish and George Millar, a teacher from Scotland, opened the Montego Bay Academy in 1841. In 1952, the academy was moved to the Presbyterian House, which was at the time located at 56 Union Street. In 1871 the academy closed its doors when representatives from Scotland encouraged the government of Jamaica to establish a Queen's College in Spanish Town. This institution also did not last long and again government-sponsored secondary education was lacking in the country.
In 1895, a Presbyterian minister, Rev. Adam Thomson, and a government representative for St. James and Trelawny, Hon. John Kerr, petitioned the government to allocate 500 pounds for secondary education in Montego Bay.

1896–1921
Thus, in 1896, Cornwall College was born. The school was at that time located on Barracks Road (site of the Public Works Office) and was called Montego Bay Government Secondary School.

Mr. E. Lockett, B.A., was named the first headmaster and he served until 1903. He was succeeded by Anglican priest, Rev. George Hibbert Leader in 1904. Leader served some 19 years at the helm of the institution which ran into difficulties due to the rapid growth of the student body and the resulting lack of classroom space. It was then that in 1909 the Hon. D. A. Corinaldi stepped in and used his considerable influence and status to procure 2,500 pounds from the government to assist in the establishment of a new school site.

Between 1910 and 1911, 34 acres of land were bought at the Pleasant Hill Estate where the institution was constructed. The school was officially opened at its new location in 1911 by the then Governor of Jamaica, Sir Sidney Olivier.

1922–Present
In 1922, Montego Bay Government Secondary School was renamed Cornwall College after Cornwall County, Jamaica in which it is located.
In 1953, Cornwall College came under the leadership of Mr. E.A. Barrett, the school's first Jamaican-born headmaster. Under Barrett's leadership, the school's population grew to over 650 boys. During his tenure, the institution was named the first government school in Jamaica and also the first high school in the West Indies to offer Chemistry and Physics as subjects in its curriculum, and for many years the majority of doctors and pharmacists in Jamaica were graduates of the school .

Cornwall College now houses some 52 classrooms and 1,245 students. Former principal, Dr. Lennox Rowe, took office from acting principal Vinette Virgo in 2016. He left the institution in 2017, upper school vice principal, Mrs. Lecia Allen took the role of acting principal. On 8 May 2018, Mr. Michael Ellis, former principal of Green Pond High School for 13 years, took office from acting principal Lecia Allen. The buildings are very colourful, sporting the school colours of red and gold.

Many well-known figures have passed through the gates of Cornwall College including Speaker of the House of Representatives: Hon. Headley Cunningham; Chief Justices Sir Rowland Phillips, Sir Herbert Duffus and Kenneth Smith; Members of Parliament: Dr. Horace Chang, Dr. Kenneth Baugh, Dr. Karl Blythe, Arthur Nelson, Lloyd B. Smith (Editor of the Western Mirror) and the late Patrick Rosegreen; Ambassador Derrick Heaven; the late Dr. Garth Taylor; the late Walt Crooks, owner of Club Inferno Resort; William "Billy" Craig, former Custos Rotulorum of St. James; Montego Bay businessman Carlton Chin; American businessman Vincent HoSang; Physics professors Dr. H. Vernon Wong and Dr. Paul M. Shand; Chemistry professor Dr. Vernon G. S. Box.

Enrollment of girls
Cornwall College no longer enrolls female students in their Sixth Form programme as of 2015–2016. The programme began at the start of the academic year 2013–2014, 117 years after the school's establishment as an all-male institution.
It ended as mentioned earlier in the academic year of 2015–2016. The programme has reverted to its original state of being unisex.

List of Headmasters and Principals

 Mr. E. V. Lockett (1896–1903)
 Rev. George Hibbert Leader (1904–1923)
 Rev. E. B. Baker (1924–1940)
 Mr. John Hardie (1940–1942)
 Lt. Col. Norman E. Jackson ( –1953)
 Mr. Everald Arthurton Barrett (1956–1966)
 Mr. James Arthur William Crick (1966–1976)
 Mr Bevill St Elmo deBruin (actg.) (1976–1978)
 Dr. Dudley Clifford Stokes (1978–1984)
 Mrs Vilma Baugh (actg.) (1984–1986)
 Mr. Noel Monteith (1986 - 1990)
 Mr. Croswell Taylor (1990? – 2006?)
 Mr. Denham McIntyre (2006–2014?)
 Mrs. Vinette Virgo (actg.) (2014–2016)
 Dr. Lennox Rowe (2016–2017)
 Mrs. Lecia Allen (actg.) (2017–2019)
 Mr. Michael Ellis (2018– )

Historic buildings
Harrison House, one of the original boarding houses at Cornwall College was declared a National Heritage site by the Jamaica National Heritage Trust in 1999.

Motto
The school's motto is Disce aut Discede — Learn or Leave.

Academics

Jamaica Scholars

 Henry Vernon Wong (1957)
 Eddison Leighton (1983)

Rhodes Scholars

 Rex Nettleford (1957)
 Henry Vernon Wong (1961)
 Ernest Milton Hew (1964)
 David McBean (1988)

Extracurricular activities 

Cornwall has been successful in extracurricular activities such as the performing arts, essay competitions, and debating competitions.

Additionally, achievements in the performing arts, one of the school's oldest and most successful, yet under-appreciated/supported societies has done excellently over the years. The young men have copped several gold and silver medals and national awards in the annual JCDC festival of the arts competition (Music & Speech) and have performed nationally at several functions island wide. Recently, the performing arts society underwent a change in the operations of its award-winning boys choir (CCBC). The school's closest neighboring school – the Mount Alvernia high school for girls V was incorporated into the school's performing arts society. They are dubbed the MACC (pronounced 'mak) Singers - (Mount Alvernia Cornwall College Singers) and serve as the combined choir for both schools. The choir has lived up to the expectations of both schools' high performance in music and have won numerous awards at music festival and the Dr. Olive Lewin Award for best choral music presentation twice (2012 and 2013).

Cornwall College has an adequate Interact Club (of Rotary International) which is a major club of its sort in western Jamaica. Their ruling government is unknown.

The art department is a well-known patron of many national poster competitions.

The Geography Club of Cornwall has participated in several events and return many trophies to the institution.

The Cornwall College Chess Club has a history of being one of the stronger chess teams in western Jamaica.

The Cornwall College cadet unit was placed first in the 4th battalion and third in the 2011 annual inspection. Cadets from Cornwall captured the top four positions on the star four examinations in February 2011. This was the first time the top four positions were taken by cadets from the same unit. Cadets from Cornwall were engaged in World War II.

Sports 

Upon entering Cornwall College, each student is assigned to one of six houses. The houses are named after prominent past principals. 

The school hosts an annual inter-house sporting competition called Sports Day.  Students compete in football, track and field, basketball, inter-house quiz and other events to earn points for their respective houses. The winning house will be crowned champion for that year. There are also team and individual medals.

The school has excelled in sports and was named one of the top male institution in football (soccer), holding the famous Olivier Shield over 11 times. Upon the inception of the schoolboy daCosta Cup competition, Cornwall College also displayed their talents and skills to grab a hold of the trophy in 1953, 55, 56, 58, 59, 63, 82, 83, 95, 2000, 2001 and 2016.
Furthermore, they are currently the defending champions of the ISSA basketball U19 and U16 competitions for the last three years.

Notable alumni

Arts and humanities
 John Ebenezer Clare McFarlane, Poet Laureate of Jamaica
 Professor Hon. Ralston Milton "Rex" Nettleford, former vice-chancellor of the University of the West Indies
 Maurice Tomlinson, Esq., attorney, law lecturer, prominent LGBTQ+ advocate, and HIV/AIDS activist
 Anthony C. Winkler, Jamaican novelist

Business
 Vincent Hosang, OD, entrepreneur and philanthropist
 Denham Jolly, Canadian businessman

Judiciary
 Sir Herbert Duffus, Chief Justice (1968–1973) and acting Governor-General of Jamaica
 Sir Rowland Phillips, Chief Justice of Jamaica (1963-1968) and acting Governor-General of Jamaica
 Hon. Kenneth Smith, OJ,  Chief Justice of Jamaica (1973-1984).

Politics
 Hon. Dr. Kenneth Baugh, former Deputy Prime Minister and Minister of Foreign Affairs and Trade
 Hon. Dr. Horace Chang, Member of Parliament for North-West St. James and Minister of Water and Housing
 Hon. Headley Cunningham, OJ, Speaker of the House of Representatives (1989-1993)
 Hon. Heroy Clarke, Member of Parliament for St. James Central Constituency
 Hon. Homer Davis, CD, JP Member of Parliament for St. James Southern

Science, technology, engineering and medicine
 Dr. Andre Haughton, Jamaican economist and politician
 Dr. The Hon. Garth Taylor, OJ, ophthalmologist and philanthropist
 Professor H. Vernon Wong, Ph.D., Plasma Physicist.

Sports
 Warren Barrett, Jamaican international footballer
 Hon. Steve Bucknor, OJ, international cricket umpire and coach
 Jourdaine Fletcher, Jamaican international footballer
 Esmond Kentish, West Indian cricketer
 Dane Richards, Jamaican international footballer
 Donovan Ricketts, Jamaican international footballer

Former teachers
 Rt. Hon. P. J. Patterson, former Prime Minister of Jamaica

References 

Boys' schools in Jamaica
Buildings and structures in Saint James Parish, Jamaica
Educational institutions established in 1896
Anglican Church in the Caribbean
Buildings and structures in Montego Bay
1896 establishments in the British Empire